Salvatoria clavata is a species of Annelida in the family Syllidae.The species is similar to Brania pusilla but is a bit longer measuring in about 2mm to 3mm, individuals in this species can even grow to 10 mm. They have parental care. It has an acrosome shaped like a beaker.

Reproduction 
They reproduce by iteroparous. The species has been classified as androdioecious, they are said to have evolved from gonochoric ancestors. In this species the eggs are fertilized and incubated in the hermaphrodite's pouch.

Occurrence 
The species has a circumglobal distribution. It can be found in the Adriatic Sea, Gulf of Mexico, Aegean Sea, the Red sea, and the Atlantic Ocean.

References 

Syllidae
Annelids